Conus neptunus, common name the Neptune cone, is a species of sea snail, a marine gastropod mollusk in the family Conidae, the cone snails and their allies.

Like all species within the genus Conus, these snails are predatory and venomous. They are capable of "stinging" humans, therefore live ones should be handled carefully or not at all.

Description
The size of an adult shell varies between 43 mm and 80 mm. The solid shell is narrow, with a concavely elevated spire and a sharp apex. The body whorl is distantly grooved towards the base. The shell has a flesh color, everywhere veined and clouded with reddish chestnut flexuous lines and spots. The aperture is rosy white.

Distribution
This species occurs off the Philippines, Australia and in the Southwest Pacific Ocean.

References

 Kosuge S. (1981) Notes on newly recorded species of the superfamily Conacea from Philippines with descriptions of new species of the genera Terebra, Conus and Glyphostoma. Bulletin of the Institute of Malacology, Tokyo 1(6): 93–96, pls 31–32. 
 Moolenbeek, R. & Röckel, D., 1997. Conus taken off Wallis and Futuna Islands, south-west Pacific (Mollusca, Gastropoda, Conidae). Bulletin du Muséum national d'Histoire naturelle 18(3–4)"1996": 387–400, sér. série 4, part. Section A
 Filmer R.M. (2001). A Catalogue of Nomenclature and Taxonomy in the Living Conidae 1758 – 1998. Backhuys Publishers, Leiden. 388pp.
 Tucker J.K. (2009). Recent cone species database. September 4, 2009 Edition
 Puillandre N., Duda T.F., Meyer C., Olivera B.M. & Bouchet P. (2015). One, four or 100 genera? A new classification of the cone snails. Journal of Molluscan Studies. 81: 1–23

Gallery

External links
 The Conus Biodiversity website
 
 Cone Shells – Knights of the Sea
 Holotype in MNHN, Paris

neptunus
Gastropods described in 1843